GNT may refer to:

 GNT, a Brazilian television channel
 George Negus Tonight, an Australian television program
 Geschwindigkeitsüberwachung Neigetechnik, a German train safety system
 Good News Translation, a Bible translation
 Grand National Teams, a North American bridge tournament
 Grand National Trunk road, in Eluru, Andhra Pradesh, India
 Gendarmerie Nationale Togolaise, a branch of the Togolese armed forces
 Guntai language
 Gunton railway station, in England
 Guntur Junction railway station, in Andhra Pradesh, India
 Gwent (preserved county), Wales, Chapman code